Saona Island is a 110 square kilometer tropical island located off the south-east coast in Dominican Republic's La Altagracia province. It is a government-protected nature reserve and is part of Parque Nacional Cotubanamá.

There are two permanent settlements, the towns of Mano Juan and Catuano. Mano Juan is a fishing village with wooden houses and "Catuano beach" has a detachment of the navy.

The island is a popular destination for tourists from all over the Dominican Republic, who arrive in fleets of catamarans and small motorboats on organized excursions every day. It is known for its beaches, and has been used on a number of occasions by filmmakers and advertisers looking for a stereotypical "deserted island" setting for their film or product.

Such notable films include Pirates of the Caribbean (2003), and The Blue Lagoon.

Etymology
Granberry and Vescelius (2004) suggest a Macoris etymology for the name Saona, comparing it with sa-ona 'full of bats' in the purportedly related Warao language of the Orinoco Delta.; However, it is widely accepted that Columbus named it after the Italian city of Savona (see below).

History
The island was baptized "Saona" by Christopher Columbus, who landed on it in May 1494 during his second voyage to the Americas. The name was meant "... to honor Michele da Cuneo, [Columbus'] friend from Savona." Columbus named Michele da Cuneo the first governor of the island.

By 1500, the Tainos on the island provided Santo Domingo with most of its cassava.

Saona Island and Savona (now part of Liguria, northern Italy) still have twinning relationships. The small power plant in Saona Island is a gift of Savona.

Geography
The seas around the Island are rich in wildlife, with many species of birds and tropical marine fish, and there are large areas where natural sandbars offshore bring the depth to just a few feet.  Smaller speed boats stop for tourists to relax in the waist-deep shallows where they snorkel, and explore the fields of starfish indigenous to the region.

Near and around Saona island are coral reef ecosystems with impressive marine diversity that attract snorkelers and scuba divers alike.

Flora and fauna
There are 539 registered species of endemic flora within the Cotubanamá National Park, all in a diversity of ecosystems including wild bushes and mangroves, semi-humid and salted forests. 

Four species of neotropical mangrove are present along the Catuano Channel - Red, White, Black, and Button Mangle.

Birds
Among the 112 species of birds on the island, the most prominent are Brown Pelicans (Pelecanus occidentalis), Magnificent Frigatebirds (Fregata magnificens), Flamingos, Seagulls, endemic Hispaniolan Parrots, and Red-footed Boobies.

Sea life
In the surrounding Caribbean Sea, 40 species of fish, 10 coral, and 124 mollusks can be found, with notable  green sea turtles,  loggerhead sea turtles, manatees, bottle-nose dolphins, rhinoceros iguanas, and octopus.

Tourism
As one of the most visited locations in the Dominican Republic with over 1 million visitors per year, Saona offers visitors a unique variety of things to do, from sunbathing on turquoise beaches, to more adventurous activities such as snorkeling. Below is a list of some of the popular activities on Saona Island.

It is the most visited protected area in the Dominican Republic, capturing 45% of the visits to protected areas in 2019.

See also

 List of islands of the Dominican Republic

References

External links

Islands of the Dominican Republic
Geography of La Altagracia Province
Protected areas of the Dominican Republic
Tourist attractions in La Altagracia Province